The 2015 Southeast Missouri State Redhawks football team represented Southeast Missouri State University as a member of the Ohio Valley Conference (OVC) during the 2015 NCAA Division I FCS football season. Led by second-year head coach Tom Matukewicz, the Redhawks compiled an overall record of 4–7 with a mark of 3–4 in conference play, placing fifth in the OVC. Southeast Missouri State played home games at Houck Stadium in Cape Girardeau, Missouri.

Schedule

References

Southeast Missouri State
Southeast Missouri State Redhawks football seasons
Southeast Missouri State Redhawks football